The Eighth Army was a Field army of the French Army during World War I and World War II.

During World War I, there were two 8th armies. The first was the former Détachement d'armée de Belgique (Army Detachment in Belgium) which existed between 16 November 1914 and 4 April 1915. The second was the former Détachement d'armée de Lorraine (Army Detachment of Lorraine) which existed between 2 January 1917 and 11 November 1918. After the armistice at the end of World War I, it was part of the occupation of the Rhineland. On 21 October 1919 it was combined with the Tenth Army to form the French Army of the Rhine.

During World War II and the Battle of France, it was part of Army Group 3 along the Maginot Line.

Commanders

World War I
 General Victor d'Urbal (20 October 1914 – 2 April 1915)
 General Putz (2 April – 22 May 1915)  (Army Detachment in Belgium)
 General Humbert (9 March – 24 July 1915)   (Army Detachment of Lorraine)
 General Gérard (24 July – 5 November 1915) (Army Detachment of Lorraine)
 General Deprez (5 November 1915 – 31 December 1916) (Army Detachment of Lorraine)
 General Gérard (31 December 1916 – 21 October 1919)

World War II
 General Marcel Garchery (2 September 1939 – 21 May 1940)
 General Emile Laure (21 May – 23 June 1940)

See also
 List of French armies in WWI

08
Field armies of France in World War I
Military units and formations of France in World War II